Habertürk (literally: "News Turkish"), abbreviated as HT, was a high-circulation Turkish newspaper. It was established on March 1, 2009 by Ciner Media Group, drawing on the brand of Ciner's Habertürk TV. It ceased publication on 5 July, 2018.

The newspaper sold on its first day of publication 360,000 copies. At 10 hours local time, the first issue was outsold. The next day's circulation totaled to 202,000. The newspaper ranked that day fifth following the dailies Hürriyet (448,296), Sabah (420,148), Milliyet (204,477) and Vatan (204,154). At its first publishing anniversary in 2010, the newspaper sold 380,000 copies, breaking its own record.

Supplements
Habertürk comes out on weekdays with supplements HT Ekonomi (economy), HT Spor (sport), HT Magazin+Bulmaca (magazin plus crossword) and HT İstanbul/Ankara/İzmir (regionals). On weekends HT Cumartesi (Saturday) and HT Pazar (Sunday) supplements are added. On Sundays, HT Kariyer (Human resources) and HT Tarih (History) supplements are added without charge.

Columnists
There are 22 columnists at the main newspaper. In addition, 19 columnists are writing for HT Spor, eleven for HT Magazin, twelve for HT Ekonomi and four more for the regional and weekend supplements. The total number of the staff is 68.

Notable columnists are:
Fatih Altaylı
Gazi Erçel
Balçiçek İlter
Murat Bardakçı
Erdem Silay

References

External links
  

Newspapers published in Istanbul
Turkish-language newspapers
Newspapers established in 2009
2009 establishments in Turkey
Ciner Media Group
Daily newspapers published in Turkey